Petr Bidař (born 18 March 1991) is a Czech former competitive pair skater. Competing with Klára Kadlecová, he placed 7th at the 2011 European Championships in Bern and 15th at the 2011 World Championships in Moscow. In January 2012, Bidař stated that they had parted ways and he would continue his career with Martina Boček. He injured his shoulder in training during the summer of 2012 and retired from competition that year following Boček's decision not to return to pairs after a fall.

His youger brother, Martin Bidař, is also a pair skater.

Programs

Pair skating with Kadlecová

Single skating

Competitive highlights 
GP: Grand Prix; JGP: Junior Grand Prix

Pair skating with Kadlecová

Single skating

References

External links 

 Petr Bidar at Tracings

Czech male pair skaters
1991 births
Living people
Sportspeople from České Budějovice